The Central District of Sanandaj County is a district (bakhsh) in Sanandaj County, Kurdistan Province, Iran. At the 2006 census, its population was 386,738, in 99,692 families.  The District has one city: Sanandaj. The District has seven rural districts (dehestan): Abidar Rural District, Arandan Rural District, Hoseynabad-e Jonubi Rural District, Howmeh Rural District, Naran Rural District, Sarab Qamish Rural District, and Zhavarud-e Sharqi Rural District.

References 

Sanandaj County
Districts of Kurdistan Province